In feudal Japan, individual military and citizens groups were primarily responsible for self-defense until the unification of Japan by Tokugawa Ieyasu in 1603. During the Edo period (1603–1868), the Tokugawa shogunate formed a centralized feudal government. Samurai warriors who once protected Japan from foreign enemies and fought each other for supremacy became the new police and internal security force. Their new job would be to ensure civil peace, which they accomplished for over 250 years.

History
During the Edo period the authoritarian Tokugawa shogunate instituted an elaborate police/security state, an administrative hierarchy was developed, and rules and regulations controlling many aspects of life in Japan went into effect. This new system of government has been called a police state, possibly the world's first.

In 1868 the samurai era ended with the overthrow of the Tokugawa shogunate and a new government came into power (Meiji government) and the samurai class was eventually abolished. In 1872, a former samurai, Kawaji Toshiyoshi, was sent to Europe to study systems of policing and he recommended a restructuring based partially on French and Prussian systems. In 1874, a nationalized police force was created using European police systems as a model. This new police force was the start of the modern police system in Japan, though it was initially dominated by former samurai from Satsuma who were part of the driving force behind the removal of the Tokugawa shogunate. The new Meiji period police continued the Edo period method of Japanese police controlling societal behavior and internal security as well as preventing and solving crimes.

Organization
The Edo period police apparatus utilized a multi-layered bureaucracy which employed the services of a wide variety of Japanese citizens. High and low ranking samurai, former criminals, private citizens and even citizen groups (Gonin Gumi) participated in keeping the peace and enforcing the laws and regulations of the Tokugawa shogunate.

Samurai police
 Machi-bugyō
During the Edo period, high ranking samurai with an allegiance to the Tokugawa shogunate (hatamoto) were appointed machi-bugyō (city administrators or commissioners). The machi-bugyō performed the roles of chief of police, prosecutor, judge and other judicial related business both criminal and civil in Edo and other major towns.
 Yoriki
Working under the machi-bugyō was the yoriki. Yoriki were samurai—they managed patrols and guard units composed of lower ranking police officials. Yoriki, being of a higher class, were able to ride a horse while performing their duties and were trusted to carry out assignments of high importance.
 Dōshin
Working under the yoriki was the dōshin. Dōshin were samurai but of a lower class than yoriki—they performed the duties of prison guard and patrol officer which required close contact with commoners (chonin). They investigated crimes such as murder and helped with executions.

Non-samurai police assistants
Edo period police relied heavily on commoners for assistance, from average village dwellers to the outcast hinin and eda castes. Members of the Japanese outcast were particularly helpful with guarding and executing prisoners, and disposing the bodies, something that samurai found to be repugnant (distasteful).
 Komono
Komono were non-samurai chōnin who went with the dōshin on patrols and provided assistance.
 Okappiki
Okappiki were non-samurai from the lowest outcast class, often former criminals who worked for the dōshin as informers and spies.
 Gōyokiki/meakashi
Gōyokiki or meakashi were a non-samurai chōnin or outcast class who were hired by local residents and merchants to work as police assistants in a particular neighborhood—they were often former criminals. The term "tesaki" was used to describe gōyokiki or meakashi later in the Edo period.

Duties
Investigating crimes, arresting and interrogating arrested suspects, torturing criminal suspects in order to obtain a confession, punishing convicted criminals including executions.

Equipment
Edo period police used a variety of armor and carried lethal and non-lethal weapons to capture criminal suspects. If possible, suspected criminals were taken alive. This meant that special weapons and tactics had to be created in order to accomplish this task.

Weapons
 Bansho rokugin or keigo roku-go: Edo period police stations were required to keep six kinds of weapons (bansho rokugin or keigo roku-go) available for use in case of disturbances. these were the kanamuchi, the kiriko no bo, the tetto, the sodegarami, the tsukubo, and the sasumata. Three of these tools were called torimono sandōgu ("three tools of arresting"), which consisted of the sodegarami, sasumata, and tsukubō. They were symbols of office and were often displayed in front of police checkpoints or used in processions, especially while convicted prisoners were being led to their execution.
 Sodegarami
 Sasumata
 Tsukubo
 Kanamuchi
 Kiriko no bo
 Tetto
 Metsubushi
 Jitte: an iron or wooden club or truncheon, the jitte was a non-lethal weapon and an official symbol of office.
 Te yari (hand spear): a small version of the yari suitable for use in confined spaces.
 Kusari fundo/manriki

Weapons

Armour
Edo period police and assistants wore chain armour clothing, armour for the hands, and armour for the head.

See also
 Criminal punishment in Edo-period Japan
 Jitte
 Law enforcement in Japan
 Shinsengumi
 Torimono sandōgu

Citations

General references 
 
 
  Original edition online.

External links
 ROLES AND TECHNIQUES OF THE POLICE DURING THE EDO PERIOD (1603–1867) by Dr. Kacem Zoughari

Defunct law enforcement agencies of Japan
Edo period
Government of feudal Japan
Ninja